is the first album by Animetal unit Animetal Lady, featuring Mie of Pink Lady as the vocalist in place of Eizo Sakamoto. Released through Sony Records on February 21, 1998, the album consists of a non-stop marathon of metal covers of shōjo anime theme songs, children's anime theme songs, and other anime theme songs sung by women. A karaoke version of the album was also released on March 21, 1998.

As with the first three Animetal albums, the cover of this album features a skeleton-like figure, which is a parody of heavy metal mascots such as Eddie of Iron Maiden and Vic Rattlehead of Megadeth. Also, certain songs incorporate instrumental arrangements of well-known rock and metal songs. For example: "Haikara-san ga Tōru" uses a bass line similar to Iron Maiden's "Wrathchild".

"Moonlight Densetsu" is included in Animetal's 1998 international release This Is Japanimetal Marathon.

Track listing
All tracks are arranged by Animetal.

Personnel
 - lead vocals
 - guitar
Masaki - bass

with

Shinki - drums (all tracks except below)
Katsuji - drums (7, 12-13, 26, 33-35)
 - drums (2, 18-21, 27-28)
 - keyboards
 - keyboards

Footnotes

References

External links

1998 debut albums
Animetal albums
Japanese-language albums
Covers albums
Sony Music Entertainment Japan albums